Nicole Sedgwick  (born 19 January 1974) is a Canadian soccer player who played as a defender for the Canada women's national soccer team. She was part of the team at the 1995 FIFA Women's World Cup.

References

External links
 
 
 Florida State stats

1974 births
Living people
Canadian women's soccer players
Canada women's international soccer players
Place of birth missing (living people)
1995 FIFA Women's World Cup players
Women's association football defenders